Shaldag is Hebrew for "kingfisher". It may refer to:

 Shaldag class fast patrol boat, an Israeli Sea Corps patrol boat
 Shaldag Unit, an Israeli Air Force commando unit